Egor i Opizdenevshie were a Soviet and Russian psychedelic rock band.

History 
The band was formed in 1990 by Egor Letov and Kuzya UO, after Letov's main band Grazhdanskaya Oborona broke up. They released three albums in their lifetime.

The first album, Pryg-skok, was released in 1990, having been recorded from May to June 1990. The album was released on vinyl, but the band name wasn't mentioned anywhere on the outer sleeve, however a sticker was provided with the record that could be affixed to a spot indicated on the package. The album was dedicated to Eugene Lishchenko and the Cameroon national football team.

The second album, Sto let odinochestva, was recorded between January 1991 and June 1992, and released in 1993. It included the song "Tuman" from the Kommunizm album Khronika pikiruyushchego bombardirovshchika, recorded in 1989 and originally issued in 1990.

In 1993, the band started recording what would become their third and final album, Psychodelia Tomorrow, but they changed their name to Grazhdanskaya Oborona shortly after the album was finished, resulting in it going unreleased until the end of the decade. In 1999, Egor Letov went back into the studio and mixed and mastered the recordings, releasing them in 2001.

The band was a studio-only project - they never gave interviews or played live, however the reformed Grazhdanskaya Oborona did play some songs from Pryg-skok and Sto let odinochestva live. A notable performance of such a song is the performance of "Pryg-skok" at the concert immortalised on the album Svoboda in 2002.

Discography 
 Pryg-skok (1992)
 Sto let odinochestva (1993)
 Psychodelia Tomorrow (2001)

Personnel 
 Egor Letov – vocals, guitar, drums
 Igor Zhevtun – guitar, bass
 Konstantin Ryabinov – guitar, bass, organ

External links 
 Egor i Opizdenevshie at Discogs

Musical groups established in 1990
Musical groups disestablished in 1993
Russian rock music groups
Soviet rock music groups